Brusqeulia is a genus of moths belonging to the family Tortricidae.

Species
Brusqeulia atrocentra Razowski & Becker, 2011
Brusqeulia atrograpta Razowski & Becker, 2011
Brusqeulia baeza Razowski & Becker, 2011
Brusqeulia bonita Razowski & Becker, 2011
Brusqeulia caracagena Razowski & Becker, 2011
Brusqeulia ceriphora Razowski & Becker, 2011
Brusqeulia costispina Razowski & Becker, 2011
Brusqeulia guaramiranga Razowski & Becker, 2011
Brusqeulia jacupiranga Razowski & Becker, 2011
Brusqeulia monoloba Razowski & Becker, 2011
Brusqeulia sebastiani Razowski & Becker, 2000
Brusqeulia signifera Razowski & Becker, 2000
Brusqeulia tineimorpha Razowski & Becker, 2011
Brusqeulia tripuncta Razowski & Becker, 2000
Brusqeulia uncicera Razowski & Becker, 2011

See also
List of Tortricidae genera

References

 , 2000: Description of six Brazilian genera of Euliini and their species (Lepidoptera: Tortricidae). Shilap Revista de Lepidopterologia 28: 385–393.
 , 2011: New species of Hynhamia Razowski and other genera close to Toreulia Razowski & Becker (Lepidoptera: Tortricidae). Polish Journal of Entomology 80 (1): 53–82. Full article: .

External links
tortricidae.com

 
Euliini
Tortricidae genera